The W. F. Ramsey Unit (previously Ramsey I Unit) is a Texas Department of Criminal Justice prison farm located in unincorporated Brazoria County, Texas, with a Rosharon postal address; it is not inside the Rosharon census-designated place. The  unit is co-located with the Stringfellow Unit and the Terrell Unit.

History
The unit opened in July 1908. The Ramsey Prison Farm consisted of five former plantations. In 1935, Ramsey housed African American prisoners. In 1963, before racial desegregation took place, the Ramsey I Unit housed white prisoners.

In 2011, the Central Unit closed. The former truck distribution center at Central moved to Ramsey.

Operations
The University of Houston–Clear Lake offers a master's degree program at Ramsey. Prisoners may pay the State of Texas after their release.

The Texas Legislature designated portions of Angleton ISD that by September 1, 1995 had not been annexed by Alvin Community College as in the Brazosport College zone. As Ramsey Unit is not in the maps of Alvin CC, it is in the Brazosport College zone. There was a section of H.B. No. 2744, filed on March 6, 2007, which would have changed the boundary between Alvin CC and Brazosport CC to put the Ramsey Unit in the Alvin CC service boundary.

Notable inmates
Notable inmates of the Ramsey Unit include:

Current:
 Shawn Allen Berry - Murderer of James Byrd, Jr. 
 Carlos Coy (South Park Mexican) 
 David Henry Tuck - perpetrator of the 2006 Harris County, Texas hate crime assault
 Roy Oliver - Murderer of Jordan Edwards
 Eddie Ray Routh  - serving life without parole for the murders of Chris Kyle and Chad Littlefield.
 Feanyichi Ezekwesi Uvukansi - Perpetrator of 2012 shooting outside a southwest Houston nightclub that left three people dead and rapper Trae tha Truth injured.
 Aaron Dean, former police officer convicted of manslaughter for killing Atatiana Jefferson.

Former:
 David Ruíz, plaintiff of Ruiz v. Estelle, served time at the historic Ramsey Farm.
 Michael Morton - Exonerated of the crime which he was convicted of. He had requested a transfer to Ramsey so he could complete a master's degree program there.
 David Owen Brooks - perpetrator of the Houston Mass Murders

References

External links

 "Ramsey Unit." Texas Department of Criminal Justice.
 Map of Ramsey Unit: Texas Tribune

Prisons in Brazoria County, Texas
Buildings and structures in Brazoria County, Texas
1908 establishments in Texas